Macrosqualodelphis is an extinct genus of river dolphins from the Early Miocene (Burdigalian) Chilcatay Formation of the Pisco Basin, Peru. The type species is M. ukupachai.

Description 
Macrosqualodelphis is distinguished from other squalodelphinids by its larger size and a less abrupt anterior tapering of rostrum in dorsal view, U-shaped left antorbital notch prominent nuchal crest higher than the frontals and nasals at the vertex, a thinner, blade-like lateral margin of the posterior portion of the rostrum, and a more voluminous temporal fossa and larger teeth.

References 

River dolphins
Prehistoric toothed whales
Miocene cetaceans
Miocene mammals of South America
Neogene Peru
Fossils of Peru
Fossil taxa described in 2018